Reichwein is a German surname. Notable people with the surname include:

 Georg Reichwein, Sr. (1593–1667), a German-Norwegian military officer
 Georg Reichwein (Jr) (1630–1710), a military government official
 Leopold Reichwein (1878–1945), German conductor and composer.
 Marcel Reichwein (b. 1986), German footballer
 Adolf Reichwein (1898–1944)
 Adolf-Reichwein-Gymnasium (ARG), a grammar school in Heusenstamm, Germany
 Rosemarie Reichwein (1904–2002), German educator and physiotherapist
 8684 Reichwein (1992 FO3), a main-belt asteroid discovered on 1992 by F. Borngen

See also 
 Richwine
 Maria Richwine
 Weinreich
 Weinrich

German-language surnames